is a Shinto shrine in Tsushima, Aichi Prefecture, Japan. For this reason, like other shrines of the network it is also called .

History
Shrine legend, unsupported by any historical documentation, claims that the shrine was founded in Tsushima by the semi-legendary Emperor Kōrei (343-215 BCE) to worship Gozutennō's aramitama (its violent side), which remained at Izumo-taisha, and it's nigemitama (calm aspect) which came to Japan from the Korean peninsula after stopping in Tsushima Island, between Korea and Japan. The shrine relocated to its current location in Owari Province in 540 CE.  This may explain the relationship between the two Tsushimas suggested by the common name.  The shrine appears in historical records from the time of Emperor Saga (786-846 CE), during whose rank it was awarded the status of First Court Rank, indicating that it was of considerable importance and antiquity by that time. It was awarded the title of Tennō-sha by Emperor Ichijō (980-1011 CE); however, for unknown reasons, it is not mentioned at all in the Engishiki records completed in 927 CE, nor in the official records of the province. In the Sengoku period, the Oda clan built Shobata Castle in the vicinity of the shrine, and the family crest of the Oda clan is the same emblem as that used by the Tsushima Shrine, indicating a close connection. The shrine was subsequently repaired by Toyotomi Hideyoshi, and it received official status and patronage by the Owari Tokugawa clan of Owari Domain under the Tokugawa shogunate in the Edo period.

With the establishment of State Shinto in the Meiji period, Tsushima Shine was initially ranked as a prefectural shrine in Modern system of ranked Shinto shrines, and its status was increased to that of a Kokuhei Shōsha (国幣小社), or National Shrine, 3rd rank, in 1926.

In 1920, the Honden of the shrine, which was built in 1605 under the patronage of Matsudaira Tadayoshi, was designated an Important Cultural Property. The building is built in the owari-zukuri style, of which few examples remain. The  Rōmon gate, built in 1591, was also designated an Important Cultural Property in 1954.

The shrine holds a festival called  in the sixth month of the lunar calendar (July in the Gregorian calendar) during which boats called  are floated on the Tennō River, and reeds are released into the water.

Gallery

References

Beppyo shrines
Shinto shrines in Aichi Prefecture
Tsushima, Aichi